Rancho Santa Maria de Los Peñasquitos was a  Mexican land grant in present-day southwestern San Diego County, California given in 1823 to Francisco María Ruiz.  The name means "Saint Mary of the Little Cliffs". It encompassed the present-day communities of Mira Mesa, Carmel Valley, and Rancho Peñasquitos in northern San Diego city, and was inland from the Torrey Pines State Natural Preserve bluffs.

History
The Rancho Santa Maria de los Peñasquitos was the first Mexican land grant in present-day San Diego County.  Ruiz built an adobe home on the rancho, which was north of the Presidio and Mission San Diego de Alcalá, and nearby the Kumeyaay settlement of Awil Nyawa. Ruiz built the first ranch house on the rancho in 1824, which was later expanded upon.

In 1837 Ruiz sold his ranch to Francisco María Alvarado - a grandnephew. After Ruiz died in 1839, Alvarado moved to the ranch, and lived in the adobe home built by Ruiz.  Alvarado married Tomasa Pico (1801 - 1876), and they gave the property to their daughter Maria Estéfana Alvarado (1840 - 1926) when she married Captain George Alonzo Johnson (1823 - 1903) in 1859.  Capt. Johnson inherited the ranch by the time the U.S. government granted a patent to the land in 1876.

The rancho was also a way station on the wagon road to Warner's Ranch from San Diego via San Pasqual and Santa Ysabel Asistencia, from the 1840s.  From 1857 to 1860 the rancho was a way station on that road for the coaches of the San Antonio-San Diego Mail Line on the 125 mile route between San Diego and Carrizo Creek Station via the Warner's Ranch road, and the Southern Emigrant Trail.  Passengers were given meals here, served by the lady of the house.  Rancho Peñasquitos was 20 miles from San Diego and 16 miles from the next station at San Pasqual.

Capt. Johnson sold the rancho in 1880 to Colonel Jacob Shell Taylor, founder of Del Mar.  Charles F. Mohnike owned the ranch in 1910. In 1921 George Sawday and Oliver Sexon bought the ranch and stocked it with cattle. Real estate developer Irvin J. Kahn bought Rancho Peñasquitos in 1962.

Historic sites of the Rancho
Rancho de Los Peñasquitos (Little Cliffs Ranch) is a historic 1823 adobe ranch home located in the Los Peñasquitos Canyon Preserve in San Diego, California.  The San Diego County Parks & Recreation department offers tours on weekends. The area has archeological sites, with artifacts  found showing indigenous people living here for over six thousand years.

Natural history
The Los Peñasquitos Canyon Preserve park also preserves habitat on the former rancho lands for more than 500 plant species, with many being rare or endemic native plants in the coastal sage scrub ecosystem. This locale was known to be quite wooded with riparian forests and oak woodlands as late as the 1880s, at which time California state survey recommended preservation of the locale's trees and woodland plant communities to prevent further erosion and subsequent flooding, which had already occurred from areas of prior deforestation. Additional present-day park land acquisition and plant restoration is ongoing. A tree endemic to only this area is the Torrey Pine, the rarest native pine in the United States and an endangered species surviving in a single mainland population within Torrey Pines State Natural Reserve and the adjacent coastal strip.

See also
California coastal sage and chaparral ecoregion
List of Ranchos of California
National Register of Historic Places listings in San Diego County, California
Ranchos of California

References

External links
Los Peñasquitos Canyon Preserve: Founder's Trail Historic Sites
official  Los Peñasquitos Canyon Preserve website
official Torrey Pines State Natural Reserve website
Torrey Pines Natural Reserve Assoc. - natural history

Santa Maria de Los Penasquitos
Santa Maria de Los Penasquitos
Adobe buildings and structures in California
Museums in San Diego
Historic house museums in California
Houses in San Diego
Historic districts in San Diego
San Antonio–San Diego Mail Line
Stagecoach stops in the United States
1823 in Alta California
1823 establishments in Alta California